Trachinops, the hulafishes, is a genus of ray-finned fish in the family Plesiopidae, the longfins or roundheads.

Species
There are four recognised species in the genus:

 Trachinops brauni Allen, 1977 (Bluelined hulafish)
 Trachinops caudimaculatus McCoy, 1890 (Southern hulafish)
 Trachinops noarlungae Glover, 1974 (Yellowhead hulafish)
 Trachinops taeniatus Günther, 1861 ( Eastern hulafish)

References

Plesiopinae
Taxa named by Albert Günther